Đầm Dơi is a rural district of Cà Mau province in the Mekong Delta region of Vietnam. As of 2003, the district had a population of 180,918. The district covers an area of 796 km². The district capital lies at Đầm Dơi.

Divisions
The district is divided into the following communes:

Cà Mau Bird Sanctuary
Đầm Dơi is famous for the Cà Mau Bird Sanctuary, which is 45 km southeast of Cà Mau City. The sanctuary is home to many types of storks. The birds in the preserve tend to make nests in the top of very high trees and search for food in the early mornings.

References

Districts of Cà Mau province